The Honda Z50R is a motorcycle produced by Honda, in the Honda Z series family of minibikes. It began production in 1979 as Honda's answer to the increasing demand for mini dirt bikes to be used on the track, as opposed to their traditional trail bike used more for leisure, such as the Z50A and Z50J. 

In 1986 Honda produced a "Special Edition" all chrome dealer model of the Z50R which they called the Z50RD. The RD had similar specs, but it was almost all chrome and polished, with red grips and seat.

The Z50R quickly evolved into a light-weight mini racing motorcycle until 1999, when it was replaced by the Honda XR50R in 2000.

See also
 List of scooter manufacturers
 Minibike
 Pocketbike
 Pit bike

References

Z50R
Motorcycles introduced in 1979
Minibikes
1967 introductions